Edgar Fawcett (May 26, 1847 – May 2, 1904) was an American novelist and poet.

Biography

Early life and education
Fawcett was born in New York City on May 26, 1847 and spent much of his life there. Educated at Columbia College, he obtained the A.B. there in 1867 and his M.A. three years later. At Columbia, he was a member of the Fraternity of Delta Phi  and the Philolexian Society.

Career
Although successful in his time, his works are mostly forgotten today.

His best known novels, such as Purple and Fine Linen (1873) and New York (1898), were satirical studies of New York high society. Fawcett also wrote a parody of the King Arthur legends entitled The New King Arthur: An Opera Without Music (1885), as well as numerous works for children, such as Short Poems for Short People (1872).

In 1877, his poem "Box" appeared in the Sacramento Daily Union having been reprinted from The Atlantic, where it would appear in the September issue. His volumes of verse included Song and Story (1884)  and Songs of Doubt and Dream (1891). His verse was frequently anthologized. "The Man from Mars" was published in the June 1892 issue of Short Stories: A Magazine of Select Fiction.

Stanley R. Harrison's study, entitled Edgar Fawcett, was published in 1972. It lists many unpublished manuscripts sent in for copyright with such titles as "The Man from Mars" and "The Destruction of the Moon," but no trace of most of these beyond the listing seems to exist.

Later life, and death
Fawcett spent many of the last years of his life in London, where he died on May 2, 1904.

Bibliography

References

Further reading

External links

 Edgar Fawcett Collection at the Harry Ransom Center
 
 
 
Poems by Fawcett at Sonnets.org

1847 births
1904 deaths
19th-century American novelists
20th-century American novelists
19th-century American poets
20th-century American poets
American male novelists
American male poets
Writers from New York City
Columbia College (New York) alumni
19th-century American male writers
20th-century American male writers
Novelists from New York (state)
Members of the American Academy of Arts and Letters